Krsmanović is a surname. Notable people with the surname include:
Branko Krsmanović (1915–1941), Yugoslav Partisans member
Nataša Krsmanović (born 1985), Serbian volleyball player
Petar Krsmanović (born 1990), Serbian volleyball player
Tijana Krsmanović (born 1994), rhythmic gymnast
Vladislav Krsmanovic (born 1964), Serbian mayor

Serbian surnames